is a 2021 Japanese animated dark fantasy film that is based on the manga series Jujutsu Kaisen 0, which is itself a prequel to the Jujutsu Kaisen manga series, both manga series having been created by Gege Akutami. It was directed by Sunghoo Park and written by Hiroshi Seko, with stars Megumi Ogata, Kana Hanazawa, Mikako Komatsu, Kōki Uchiyama, Tomokazu Seki, Yuichi Nakamura, and Takahiro Sakurai. Produced by MAPPA, the film follows Yuta Okkotsu, a young student who becomes a sorcerer and seeks to control the cursed spirit of his childhood friend Rika Orimoto in Jujutsu High, alongside other skilled sorcerers in training.

Originally intended as an arc of the television series, MAPPA changed the format of it during discussion. Besides the story focusing on Yuta and his friends, the staff decided to expand the narrative from that of the original manga by adding new scenes focused on the students' mentor Satoru Gojo and his old friend and enemy Suguru Geto. King Gnu performed the two theme songs. Given the large budget for the movie, MAPPA aimed to make more appealing fight sequences than the ones from the TV series. Jujutsu Kaisen 0 was released in Japan in December 2021 by Toho.

Upon its release, the film received positive reviews for the accessible narrative and Yuta's story. The fight sequences created by MAPPA were praised, as well as the film's soundtrack. It was the highest-grossing film in Japan in 2021, and also took in a $196.2 million in revenues worldwide.

Plot
High school student Yuta Okkotsu suffers from being frequently bullied, when one day, his bullies are brutally killed by a cursed spirit that clings to him. The higher-ups of the Jujutsu Society wish to have the boy killed, as his curse is a dangerous spirit. However, a teacher at Tokyo Jujutsu Technical High, Satoru Gojo, recruits Yuta to join the school, thus saving him. Yuta explains that the cursed spirit is Rika, a childhood friend whom he had promised to marry when they grew up. Rika died in a freak accident and became an overprotective spirit that harms anyone who threatens him. Yuta meets fellow students Maki Zen'in, Toge Inumaki, and Panda, all with distinct abilities of their own.

During his first mission with Maki, Yuta successfully summons Rika on his own for the first time to save them from a cursed spirit. Three months pass in his school training, and he grows close to Maki, Inumaki, and Panda. One day, on a mission with Inumaki, the boys are attacked by a high-level curse. The man behind the attack was Suguru Geto, a previous student and old friend of Gojo's, who was banished from the school after killing over a hundred innocent people. Geto started a cult to help troubled people so he can absorb cursed spirits using his technique.

Geto attempts to get Yuta on his side so they can make use of Rika, but Yuta refuses when he insults Yuta's friends. Geto declares war: he will release a thousand curses upon the city to kill non-sorcerer humans, as he believes sorcerers to be above them. Geto's real reason for the war, however, is to distract Gojo so he can kill Yuta and absorb Rika. Gojo realizes this upon learning of Yuta's background, and sends Inumaki and Panda back to the school to protect him and Maki, both of whom are not taking part in the battle as newbies. Geto overpowers them all, leaving only Yuta. Enraged at seeing his friends hurt, Yuta promises himself as a sacrifice to Rika if she unleashes her full power to defeat Geto. As a result, Geto is severely wounded. He is found by Gojo, who finishes him off.

Gojo reveals that Yuta was the one who inadvertently cursed Rika rather than the other way around, by being unable to accept her death. Both Yuta and Gojo are descendants of one of the strongest sorcerers in history, making them distant relatives and explaining their powerful abilities. Yuta broke the curse after promising himself to Rika, and she is able to pass on. Yuta continues as a sorcerer-in-training with his friends.

In a post-credits scene, Geto's former ally Miguel eats lunch with Yuta in Kenya, and Gojo comes to join them.

Voice cast

Production

Discarded content
MAPPA animator Sunghoo Park originally wanted to cover the Yuta Okkotsu story from the first few episodes of the Jujutsu Kaisen anime based on the original Jujutsu Kaisen 0 by Gege Akutami which serves as the basis for the main series. However, the idea was scrapped and the anime but the anime began, with Yuji Itadori's introduction to the world of sorcerers and curses. In the original format, Park would adapt the series' first three episodes to develop Yuji and then replace him with Okkotsu, but that idea was discarded. Park later felt that telling the Jujutsu Kaisen prequel would fit the movie format more than a television series. Seko commented that, for the movie to fill two hours, he would need to add new material, such as Okkotsu's past and the relationship between Gojo and Geto. Seko said that the action scenes of Akutami's manga are the most important part of that series, he wanted to focus on them in the movie. Park agreed and added elements of Chinese movies to the film, which he wanted fans to look forward to.

Handling as a film
Like the Jujutsu Kaisen television series, the film is produced by MAPPA and directed by Sunghoo Park, with scripts by Hiroshi Seko and character designs by Tadashi Hiramatsu. The film was announced after the Jujutsu Kaisen anime television series finale in March 2021. While the television series was noted for having entertaining fight scenes, the team wanted to improve them. While not too different from the television series, Park aimed to make the film have its own style, such as the background colors when the sky is shown. Park noted there were multiple challenges in making the animated movie, when compared with his experience with live-actions, due to the amount of animation needed.

Park said that the movie would include new content not featured in the original Jujutsu Kaisen 0 manga. This was mainly because the movie was based on a single manga volume, and the team aimed to make a long film rather than a thirty minute work. MAPPA CEO Manabu Otsuka said that the team was impressed by the original Jujutsu Kaisen 0 and believed the fans would like to see it adapted. Seko said he had to alter the parts from the original series to make Yuta's character arc more notable. The post-credits scene of the movie is an original scene not present in the manga. Toho had doubts about creating such content until they contacted Akutani who gave them the idea.

Park wanted to be careful to give an appropriate facial expression to each character when fighting. He considers the new protagonist, Yuta Okkotsu, as a representative teenager possessed by loneliness, in this case caused by being beset by Rika's Curse. Megumi Ogata surprised Park in the making of the movie by giving Yuta a sensitive characterization in crying. Due to Jujutsu Kaisen 0 being a film, Park aimed to give it an appropriate environment, most notably Jujutsu High, where Yuta starts exorcising demons with his teammates. Several animators were not accustomed to drawing pictures in a cinemascope frame; but still they were able to draw wider scenery and backgrounds beautifully, and felt satisfied that they were able to create the world of the franchise for the audience.

The inclusion of Gojo was to be seen as natural, especially focusing on his relationship with Geto, which is also explored in the television series. However, Park claimed the staff did not want to give such characters too much screen time, due to how the narrative primarily focuses on Yuta and Rika. Another addition to the movie, not present in the original work, was the four consecutive Black Flashes that Nanami mentioned in an interview in the TV series. Seko was requested by the director to feature in the climax a new fight scene between Gojo and Miguel. Seko said that the team expanded Yuta and Geto's final fight by adding a scene where the latter vomits blood.

Casting

 In casting Megumi Ogata, Gege Akutami envisioned the character as "neutral, soft, and kind, and there is also a big emotional swing and head." Ogata's name was mentioned as an example of an actor close to that, and in response to that, the director Sunghoo Park and the anime staff unanimously decided to cast her. Ogata herself said she would like to cherish the original image as well as create her own image of Yuta. Ogata describes him as an attractive character due to how strong he becomes when interacting with others. Sunghoo Park was also behind the casting of Yuta's voice actor, although Yuta was now a young male voiced by a woman. 
 Kana Hanazawa was cast to voice Rika. She wanted to audition, as she was a fan of the original anime and television series. The story of Rika's childhood left a major impression on Hanazawa, who looked forward to interacting with Ogata. Hanazawa enthusiastically expressed Rika's love for Yuta, and Ogata praised Hanazawa's work.
 Mikako Komatsu was cast to voice Maki Zen'in. Komatsu noted that certain scenes involving Yuta's romance were too erotic for the movie, while Ogata found the early Yuta to be slapstick. Her character design was noted to be different from the one previously seen in other Jujutsu Kaisen works. Komatsu enjoyed her more comical take as Maki, who often has arguments with Panda and other students, as the character is a year younger than in the television series. She noted an early scene in the moviem where Maki and Yuta interact in a way that helps to develop the former's characterization and past as Maki's backstory is given. 
 Koichi Yamadera voices Miguel, a brilliant curse master, and is a more veteran voice actor than others in the cast.
 Tomokazu Seki, another veteran voice actor, played the role of a Panda. Despite feeling pressure about his work, Seki was glad to work in the movie. Seki had little-to-no understanding of his character, due to how comical and simple he is shown in contrast to the more elaborate characterizations from the rest of the cast. Park told Seki that he is like a father to the movie, but Seki still did not understand Panda, even when interacting with Nakamura, to the point he wished Gege Akutami had explored the character more. Nevertheless, Seki claims he is good at the fighting scenes, which would surprise the audience. 
 Kōki Uchiyama voices Toge Inumaki. He did not see a major difference between his character and other classmates. He saw their interactions with newcomer Yuta Okkotsu as the main attraction of the film. Inumaki's lines are limited, since he uses keywords relating to food to interact. Uchiyama gives subtle nuances to most of his lines and has said that he tries placing emphasis on the amount of emotion he can provide, in order to capture Inumaki's mostly silent character.
 Yuichi Nakamura voices the returning character Satoru Gojo. The character has different facial expressions, from the serious to the comical, and Nakamura was given latitude regarding the vocal range used. Nakamura reiterated at the recording site that he enjoyed the comedy. He did not find a change in Gojo's characterization from the main Jujutsu Kaisen series, and thought Gojo's mentoring of Yuta similar to that for the other protagonists. He enjoyed the multiple recording takes he had, as well as the many school-like relationships. He was impressed by Ogata's work as Yuta, in giving the character a wide range of emotions. 
 Takahiro Sakurai voices Geto and was amazed by how cool the protagonists of the movie are. Sakurai read the original Jujutsu Kaisen 0, before recording the movie, which surprised him with a major revelation about Geto. He received lectures from the director during the recording of the movie. Among multiple traits of the character, Sakurai was surprised by the friendly relationship between Geto and Gojo. Although it was the first time Geto and Yuta interacted, Sakurai had already worked with Ogata multiple times and praised her work, as he found her portrayal of Yuta to be deep.

Music

The music was composed by Hiroaki Tsutsumi, Yoshimasa Terui, and Alisa Okehazama. The official soundtrack was released on December 22, 2021.

King Gnu performed the film's theme song , as well as the ending song . "Ichizu" puts the focus on the relationship between Yuta and Rika. Vocalist and guitarist Daiki Tsuneta wrote the song. There was pressure to make the ideal masterpiece that the audience has been waiting for, but Tsuneta thinks that it was a straight song with a tingling and punch that is perfect for the world view of Jujutsu Kaisen. "Sakayume" was supposed to be recorded simultaneously on the CD single released on December 29 as a companion song to "Ichizu".

Marketing
The film was announed in March 2021 in the credits of the final Jujutsu Kaisen episode of the first season of the television series. In June 2021, the "Juju Fes 2021" MAPPA revealed to the audience the first poster of Yuta and Rika, with Akutami himself drawing his own rendition to celebrate. In the first teaser in July, it was revealed that Yuta was being voiced by Megumi Ogata, and Kana Hanazawa's role as Rika was revealed shortly afterwards. In promoting the movie, advertisements with Gojo as a dog were made alongside SoftBank Group.

A novel adaptation by Baraddo Kitaguni, based on Hiroshi Seko's script, was published on the film's premiere date. A Jujutsu Kaisen #0.5 Tokyo Prefectural Jujutsu High School booklet was given to the film's audience members; it had a print run of 5 million copies. The booklet included an exclusive nine-page manga by Akutami, about the daily life of Okkotsu and the other first-year students, thumbnail layouts for the first chapter of the Jujutsu Kaisen 0 manga, the film's designs, a question-and-answer session with Akutami, and comments by the anime's staff and cast of the film.

Release

Theatrical
Distributed by Toho, the film premiered theatrically in Japan on December 24, 2021, in 418 theaters, with some IMAX screenings. The film was screened in 4D and Dolby Cinema formats in Japan starting on February 5, 2022. The film ended its run in Japanese theaters on May 29, 2022.

Crunchyroll, in association with Funimation, acquired rights to the film, which theatrically premiered in North America on March 18, 2022, in over 1,500 theaters. The film had an early screening in the United Kingdom and Ireland on March 10, 2022, while the general opening in the UK was on March 18. The film is distributed by Sony in the United Kingdom.

The film's English-language-dubbed version included returning actors for Yuta's teammates, with the most notable newcomers being Kayleigh McKee as Yuta and Anairis Quiñones as Rika. McKee saw Yuta's story as a coming-of-age story, due to his need to control Rika while making friends. Anairis Quiñones took notes of Hanakawa's style when recording her take of Rika in the English dub. Allegra Clark saw Maki as a more vulnerable and angry character than in the television series, but found the character changed in the course of the narrative. The group worked to make the audio faithful to that of the original Japanese cast, based on the casting director's ideas. Matthew David Rudd, the voice of Panda, said that the inclusion of his character was a "baller" moment. On the other hand, Xander Mobus had little-to-no idea what was going through Inumaki's mind, since the character speaks only random words. However, Clark, Rudd, and Mobus stated that their characters were well developed in their interactions with Yuta. Lex Lang felt that Geto was more appealing in the film than in the anime, as the movie delves into Geto's idealism. Meanwhile, Kaiji Tang found Gojo to be similar to the anime incarnation, though in the film his relationship with Geto has more depth.

Medialink licensed the film to be shown in Southeast Asia, China, Hong Kong, Macau, Taiwan, and India; that company itself handled the distribution in Chinese-speaking areas, while Purple Plan handled the distribution for most parts of Southeast Asia. The film premiered in South Korea in February 2022, while in Malaysia, the film premiered on March 10, 2022, exclusively at TGV Cinemas. In India, the film was released on June 30, 2022, on 200 screens with 50,000 advance ticket sales across India.

Home media
The Blu-ray and DVD versions of the film were released in Japan on September 21, 2022. Besides the regular version, a special edition featuring interviews, live footage of the film's premiere, and a commentary track was also released in Japan. The regular DVD sold 30,000 copies during its release week, while the deluxe edition sold 28,000 copies, with both topping charts and surpassing the record sales of the 2021 film My Hero Academia: World Heroes' Mission as the best-selling anime DVD of 2022 in its first week of release. The deluxe Blu-ray edition sold 65,000 units while the regular edition sold 27,000 units during their releases weeks, which also set records in charts, overtaking the record set by the anime Girls und Panzer.

Reception

Box office

Japan
About 15,000 people watched the film at the earliest public screenings on 58 screens at midnight on the opening day. It was originally planned to screen at midnight on only 28 screens in 14 theaters in Kyoto, Miyagi, Tokyo, Osaka, Aichi, Fukuoka, and Hokkaido. However, tickets sold out on the first day of sales, and theaters eventually expanded the number of screens showing the film. Distributor Toho projected that the film would sell over 1 million tickets on its opening day. The film debuted at #1 and earned ¥2.694 billion ($23.5 million) in its first three days. The film is the highest-earning film at the Japanese box office from 2021, surpassing Evangelion: 3.0+1.0 Thrice Upon a Time. Overall, the film has earned a total of 13.75 billion yen (about US$108.1 million) in its run in Japanese theaters; it was the 8th all-time highest-earning anime film in Japan and the 14th highest-earning film in Japanese box office history, until September 2022, when it was surpassed by One Piece Film: Red.

Other territories
The film was released in the United States and Canada on March 18, 2022, and was projected to gross $8–13 million from 2,336 theaters in its opening weekend. It opened with $5.8 million from 2,297 theatres on Friday, including $2.9 million from Thursday-night preview screenings. The film went on to an estimated $17.7 million opening weekend, finishing second behind The Batman. Men made up 61% of the audience during its opening, with those in the 18–34 age group comprising 75% of ticket sales. The ethnic breakdown of the audience showed that 32% were Hispanic and Latino Americans, 25% Caucasian, 20% Asian or other, and 17% African American. The film's per-screen average of $6,443 was the fourth highest in the first quarter of 2022, below The Batman, Uncharted and Scream.

In the United Kingdom, the film had a three-day opening weekend of £514,000 (the fourth highest that weekend) and a five-day opening (including previews) of £822,000, the second highest that week below The Batman. In France, it sold 347,583 tickets in its opening weekend, the third highest that week, below The Batman and Notre-Dame brûle.

In November 2022, it was reported that the film had sold 20.51 million tickets to earn over 26.5 billion yen (about US$191.1 million) worldwide, with a worldwide box office total of US$195,870,885, making Jujutsu Kaisen 0 the sixth highest-earning anime film of all time worldwide (unadjusted for inflation), surpassed by Demon Slayer: Kimetsu no Yaiba – The Movie: Mugen Train, three Hayao Miyazaki films (Spirited Away, Howl's Moving Castle, and Ponyo) and Your Name.

Critical response
The film was one of the most awaited 2021 anime adaptations, behind the second season of Demon Slayer: Kimetsu no Yaiba. On the review aggregator website Rotten Tomatoes, the film has an approval of 98%, based on 53 reviews, with an average rating of 7.9/10. The site's consensus is "Jujutsu Kaisen 0: The Movie offers a thrilling, beautifully animated gift for fans of the anime – and a story that holds up as a standalone effort." 

The film garnered positive responses from critics. Yuta's relationship with Rika's Curse was praised for giving the former a more unpredictable characterization and the horror provided by the latter. Movie news website We Got This Covered compared Yuta's curse with themes of trauma, while Polygon instead saw a person not being able to accept the death of his friend. Anime UK News enjoyed the handling of Yuta's arc and how Satoru Gojo's character is explored more in depth in the film than in the original series. Siliconera and the Los Angeles Times, among others, praised the film for being accessible to every new viewer as, instead of focusing on the returning Yuji Itadori's group, it deals with newcomer Yuta, and the minor characters from the television series are also explored. Anime News Network felt that the film did not contain surprising changes to the story when compared with the television series. Otaku USA lamented the prequel story was only used for a movie, rather than a mini-series, as he saw the cast as likable enough to carry more screentime, with special focus on Geto, whose entire background and role make him an appealing villain. Polygon liked the character of Suguru Geto, labeling him an entertaining villain.

Polygon praised MAPPA's most appealing animation scenes, mainly those involving Yuta and Suguru Geto, and pointed out that they are superior to most of their past works such as The God of High School. Anime News Network enjoyed the handling of the fight scenes. IGN cited the designs of each curse, as they give a striking impression, while also involving interesting sequences of movements. The Los Angeles Times agreed, citing some curses as having bizarre appearances and that the violence might be too strong for a sensitive audience while returning audiences would not be disappointed by these sequences. Otaku USA also praised the fight scenes, citing fan-favorite Satoru Gojo's ones. Yatta-Tachi also applauded the animation, calling it "utterly superb" and "best key animated action cuts in anime". The Guardian enjoyed both the animation as well as how it mixes with the soundtrack in order to produce scenes composed of an "adrenaline-pumping showdown between good and evil, as a web of painstakingly detailed monsters of all kinds spring into gory action".

Megumi Ogata's portrayal, in Japanese, of Yuta was acclaimed by Anime News Network and IGN for making the character stand out more in the movie than in the original manga: for example, when he changes from a calm tone, the portrayal of which was compared to her early portrayals of Shinji Ikari from Neon Genesis Evangelion, to a more aggressive tone, when there are elements of horror or action. Other actors praised included Mikako Komatsu for her performance as Maki, and Yuuichi Nakamura for Gojo. The Fandom Post compared Kayleigh McKee's voice work with that of Spike Spencer, who voiced Shinji in the English dub of the series, and wondered whether it was intentional. Hitc equally praised McKee, Ogata, and Hanazawa for making Yuta more appealing alongside Rika. Pop Culture Maniac was more negative about McKee's work for making Yuta sound childish rather than traumatized. Besides the soundtrack, the two main theme songs of the movie were the subject of positive responses by Anime UK News.

Ending
In the climax of the movie, Yuta manages to overpower Geto, who escapes after suffering severe wounds. As he tries to leave, Gojo appears and kills him. This scene confused the viewers of the movie, due to Geto still appearing in the television series that was set a year after the time in the movie. The nature of Suguru Geto's survival is not explained, either, in the first season of the anime and, instead, writers claimed that fans have to read the main anime series as the manga explains properly the nature of Suguru Geto once Gojo meets him again. Comic Book Resources noted the that while the film several changes, the inclusion of the first anime series characters but only as cameos. Meanwhile, Gojo's relationship with Geto in the climatic scene was altered, with the manga presenting a less emotive and tragic resolution.

The post-credits scene was also the subject of confusion, as Yuta is seen having a meal with Geto's underling Miguel in Kenya until both are interrupted. IGN says this scene is teased in the main anime series when Gojo explains his reasons for leaving Japan for a short time, with Yuta explaining the true reason for journeying to Kenya, in the manga, once he reappears in the main series. Miguel's inclusion in the final scene is also explained in the manga.

Accolades
The film was nominated for the 45th Japan Academy Film Prize under the Animation of the Year category. It was listed as one of the best films from 2022 by HobbyConsolas, while it remained at the top in a Web Magazine article. At the 2022 Newtype Anime Awards, the film took third place in Best Picture (Film). Seko took 10th place in Best Screenplay, Park was seventh in Best Director, Tsutsumi, Terui, and Okehazama took sixth place in Best Sound, Tadashi Hiramatsu took sixth place in Best Character Design, and Yuta reached fifth place in Best Male Character. In the Manga Barcelona Awards, the film won the Best Anime Film award. The film also won the 2021 Animages Anime Grand Prix poll, with Yuta and Gojo taking second and third best male characters awards, behind Tengen Uzui from Demon Slayer: Kimetsu no Yaiba. In 2023, the film won Best Film at the 7th Crunchyroll Anime Awards.

References

External links
  
 

2021 anime films
Action anime and manga
Animated films set in Tokyo
Anime films based on manga
Crunchyroll Anime Awards winners
Dark fantasy anime and manga
Films about curses
Films set in Sendai
IMAX films
Japanese fantasy action films
MAPPA
Toho animated films
Yōkai in anime and manga